Gesves is a municipality of Wallonia located in the province of Namur, Belgium. 

The municipality consists of the following districts: Faulx-les-Tombes, Gesves, Haltinne, Mozet, and Sorée. It also includes the hamlets of Gramptinne, Goyet (site of glacial remnants of Neanderthals), Haut-Bois, and Strud  (site where fossil of Strudiella devonica, a Late Devonian insect, was discovered).

On 1 January 2006 the municipality had 6,321 inhabitants. The total area is 64.92 km², giving a population density of 97 inhabitants per km².
On 1 December 2019, the population had grown to 7,246 inhabitants (3,612 men and 3,634 women), representing a growth of 14.63% over the course of 13 years.

See also
 List of protected heritage sites in Gesves

References

External links 
 
  (in French)
Gesves.com portal (in French)

Municipalities of Namur (province)